"Look at Us" is a song co-written and recorded by American country music artist Craig Morgan.  It was released in May 2004 as the fourth single from the album I Love It.  The song reached #27 on the Billboard Hot Country Singles & Tracks chart.  The song was written by Morgan, Larry Bastian and Buddy Cannon.

Chart performance

References

2004 singles
2003 songs
Craig Morgan songs
Songs written by Buddy Cannon
Songs written by Craig Morgan
BBR Music Group singles
Songs written by Larry Bastian